The National Resistance Front of Afghanistan (NRF), also known as the Second Resistance, is a military alliance of former Northern Alliance members and other anti-Taliban fighters loyal to the Islamic Republic of Afghanistan. The founder and president of NRF is Ahmad Massoud. When the Taliban captured Afghanistan on 15 August 2021, former first vice president Amrullah Saleh, citing provisions of the 2004 Constitution, declared himself the caretaker president of Afghanistan and announced the republican resistance against the Taliban. Saleh's claim to the presidency was endorsed by Ahmad Massoud, as well as by former Afghan Minister of Defence Bismillah Mohammadi, and the Afghan embassy in Tajikistan including its ambassador Mohammad Zahir Aghbar.

The NRF exercised de facto control over the Panjshir Valley, which is largely contiguous with Panjshir Province and, as of August 2021, was "the only region out of the Taliban's hands." The alliance constitutes the only organized resistance to the Taliban in the country, and is possibly planning an anti-Taliban guerilla struggle. The resistance has called for an "inclusive government" of Afghanistan; one of their objectives is speculated to be a stake in the new Afghan government. However, Hibatullah Akhundzada, the Taliban's reclusive leader, has effectively ruled out an inclusive government.

On 6 September 2021, the Taliban claimed victory in controlling the province. The NRF, however, denied the Taliban victory, stating they continued to hold positions across the valley.  the NRF controls no territory but continues to carry out hit and run guerrilla attacks.

History

A mountainous region, Panjshir was a formidable base of operations for anti-Soviet fighters and later for the original Northern Alliance. It was the birthplace of anti-Soviet and Northern Alliance leader Ahmad Shah Massoud. Ahmad Shah Massoud's son, Ahmad Massoud, is widely seen as his successor.

In July 2021, during the 2021 Taliban offensive, the remnants of the Northern Alliance began mobilizing under an umbrella called Resistance II.

On 9 September, the NRF announced that a parallel government will be created in response to the Taliban's formation of its government in Kabul. It was announced on 29 September that Amrullah Saleh will lead the government in exile, according to a statement published by the Afghan Embassy in Geneva, Switzerland, which also backs the NRF.

On 1 November, it was reported that the NRF has opened a liaison office in Washington DC after being registered with the US Justice Department in order to carry out lobbying missions to various politicians working in the city.

On 23 November, Sibghatullah Ahmadi was appointed as the new spokesman of the NRF. The position was previously held by Mohammad Fahim Dashty, who was killed during the Taliban offensive into Panjshir on 5 September.

Coalescence in Panjshir

Following the Fall of Kabul, anti-Taliban forces, including former Vice President Saleh, moved into the Panjshir Valley, the only area of Afghanistan not controlled by the Taliban, in order to create a new resistance front.

As of 17 August, the Panjshir Valley was—according to one observer—"under siege on all sides" but had not come under direct attack. Ahmad Massoud wrote in an op-ed to The Washington Post on 18 August 2021, calling for the rest of the world to help them, as he admits that ammunition and supplies will run out unless Panjshir can be supplied. Massoud has stated his desire to negotiate with the Taliban. Ali Maisam Nazary, spokesman for the resistance, said that the Taliban were overstretched after they seized control of Kabul.

On 17 August 2021, ethnic Tajik former soldiers of the Afghan National Army began to arrive in the Panjshir valley, with tanks and personnel carriers in support of the resistance. They regrouped in Andarab district, Baghlan after they escaped Kunduz, Badakhshan, Takhar, and Baghlan before moving to the safety of Panjshir.

According to unconfirmed reports, Saleh's command managed to recapture Charikar, the provincial capital of Parwan Province, which had been held by the Taliban since 15 August, and that fighting had begun in Panjshir. At around the same time, unconfirmed reports stated that remnants of the Afghan National Army had begun massing in the Panjshir Valley at the urging of Massoud, along with the Minister of Defense Bismillah Mohammadi and provincial commanders. Local civilians also responded to his calls to be mobilized.

The Panjshir resistance also claimed to have the support of Abdul Rashid Dostum and Atta Muhammad Nur on 18 August 2021, while it was reported that members of Dostum's group, which had retreated into Uzbekistan, said that 10,000 of their soldiers could join forces with the Panjshir resistance, creating a combined force of 15,000 or more. On the same day, Afghan Embassy employees in Tajikistan have replaced photos of Ghani in the embassy building with those of Saleh.

According to anonymous ex-American and British soldiers, some of whom were formerly Afghan-based contractors, numerous Afghans living/working abroad have been working together to raise money in order to assist the Panjshir-based fighters.

Baghlan Province
On 20 August 2021, a group of anti-Taliban forces was organised in Baghlan Province, headed by Abdul Hamid Dadgar. The group took over the Andarab, Pul-e-Hesar and De Salah districts of Baghlan Province, killing or injuring 60 Taliban fighters as they did so. In the mid-afternoon, unconfirmed reports from Panjshir stated that Pul-e-Hesar was taken back from the Taliban, and that fighting was still raging in De Salah and Banu, with a reporter with Iran International reporting soon after that first Andarab and then De Salah fell to the resistance.

According to Sediqullah Shuja, a former member of the Afghan National Security Forces, the reasons for the removal of the Taliban from the Andarab valley towns was the Taliban's searching of private houses, which was perceived as a violation of the agreement by which the Taliban had been allowed to take military control of the towns. Shuja stated that the Taliban entered houses "and harassed people. In our villages, people are very traditional and Muslim. There is no reason for Taliban to come and teach us about Islam." Former Baghlan prison commander Abdul Rahman stated that "All people of the valley have risen up against the Taliban. We are not afraid of Taliban fighters."

Overseas work
On 16 September 2022, Ahmad Massoud urged fellow Afghans living overseas to work together to find a way to end Taliban rule and bring them back to negotiations.

Analysis
Russian Ambassador to Afghanistan Dmitry Zhirnov labeled the resistance as "doomed" and that the resistance would fail. Zhirnov further stated that Saleh's proclamation of caretaker president is unconstitutional and added that they have "no military prospects". Zhirnov also stated his plans to mediate talks between the Resistance and the Taliban.

According to The Economist, the resistance's cause looked "forlorn". The Independent mentions concerns that the fighters in Panjshir are likely to be outmatched as Taliban fighters have captured or acquired western-made military weapons and equipment with artillery and aircraft during the offensive.

An anonymous Afghan journalist said that the group needs to start making plans for a drawn-out resistance against the Taliban if they are to hold Panjshir. Analyst Bill Roggio also argued that the Panjshir resistance's "prospects are bleak", although their base was well-defendable, and Saleh could rely on a wide network of potential supporters across the entire country.

Afghan specialist Gilles Dorronsoro from Sorbonne University said that Taliban forces could enforce a lockdown on Panjshir, since it was not a major threat. There was also a concern with Saleh and Massoud coming from different political backgrounds, with the latter not having the same level of charisma as his father, even though both oppose the Taliban. Kim Sengupta said that support for the resistance would depend on how unpopular the Taliban were and how far people would be willing to stand up against them despite the Taliban's insistence that they would not allow their fighters to persecute people who had worked with the previous government or with NATO-led forces.

David Loyn suggested that the resistance had a better chance of gaining more support from Afghans of other ethnic groups resisting the Taliban if Saleh were seen as the head of a broad coalition rather than only representing Tajiks. Loyn said that the rest of the world might have a reason not to recognize the Taliban if the fighters continued to face the Taliban and recapture territory.

Foreign Policy stated that there are generations of Afghans who had not previously experienced life under Taliban rule and were likely to resist. They stated that if the Taliban continued to target persons with links to the former government, then support for resistance would grow, but that support would drop if a future government included Hamid Karzai and Abdullah Abdullah.

Kaweh Kerami warned that if the Taliban were able to defeat the Panjshir fighters, then they would be able to roll back the gains made by the international community in developing Afghanistan. He also said that there would be resistance if the Taliban's ideas on an inclusive government meant the inclusion of a few "weak" politicians from previous government administrations.

See also

National Front of Afghanistan
2021–2022 Afghan protests

References

2020s in Afghanistan
2021 establishments in Afghanistan
Islamic Republic of Afghanistan
Military units and formations established in 2021
Military units and formations of the War in Afghanistan (2001–2021)
Rebel groups in Afghanistan
August 2021 events in Afghanistan